Pizzo Castello is a mountain of the Lepontine Alps, located in the canton of Ticino, Switzerland. It is situated in the upper Valle Maggia, between the Val Bavona (west) and Valle di Peccia (east).

References

External links
 Pizzo Castello on Hikr

Mountains of the Alps
Mountains of Switzerland
Mountains of Ticino
Lepontine Alps